The Battle of the Masts or Battle of Phoenix was a crucial naval battle fought in 655 (A.H. 34) between the Muslim Arabs led by Abu al-A'war and the Byzantine fleet under the personal command of Emperor Constans II. The battle was part of the earliest campaign by Muawiyah to reach Constantinople and is considered to be "the first decisive conflict of Islam on the deep".

Dating
Al-Tabari records two possible dates for this naval battle: 651–652 (A.H. 31) on the authority of al-Waqidi and 654–655 (A.H. 34) on the authority of Abu Ma'shar al-Sindi. The chronicles of the Armenian Sebeos and Byzantine Theophanes concur with the latter date.

Background
In the 650s the Arab Caliphate completed its conquest of the Sasanian Empire and continued its successful expansion into the Byzantine Empire's territories. In 645, Abdallah ibn Sa‘d was made Governor of Egypt by his foster brother Rashidun Caliph Uthman, replacing the semi-independent 'Amr ibn al-'As. Uthman permitted Muawiyah to raid the island of Cyprus in 649 and the success of that campaign set the stage for the undertaking of naval activities by the Government of Egypt. Abdallah ibn Sa'd built a strong navy and proved to be a skilled naval commander. Under him the Muslim navy won a number of naval victories including repulsing a Byzantine counter-attack on Alexandria in 646.

In 654, Muawiyah undertook an expedition in Cappadocia while his fleet, under the command of Abu'l-Awar, advanced along the southern coast of Anatolia. Emperor Constans embarked against it with a large fleet.

Battle
The two forces met off the coast of Mount Phoenix in Lycia, near the harbour of Phoenix (modern Finike). According to the 9th century chronicler Theophanes the Confessor, as the Emperor was preparing for battle, on the previous night he dreamt that he was in Thessalonica; awaking he related the dream to an interpreter of dreams who said: Emperor, would that you had not slept nor seen that dream for your presence in Thessalonica – according to the interpreter, victory inclined to the Emperor's foes. The interpreter interpreted the dream this way because Θεσσαλονίκη ("Thessaloniki") sounds similar to the words '', which mean 'give victory to another'.

Due to the rough seas, Tabari describes the Byzantine and Arab ships being arranged in lines and lashed together, to allow for melee combat. The Arabs were victorious in battle, although losses were heavy for both sides, and Constans barely escaped to Constantinople. According to Theophanes, he managed to make his escape by exchanging uniforms with one of his officers.

Siege of Constantinople of 655 
Following their defeat, the respite the Romans were granted is typically ascribed to the Arab fleet retreating after its victory and conflict over the authority of Uthman among the crew, the first stirrings of a civil war among the Muslims. No further naval attacks on this expedition are recorded in traditional Arabic sources.

However the Armenian historian Sebeos records that the Arab fleet continued on beyond the battle at Phoenix to attempt a siege of Constantinople. The siege was unsuccessful, however, due to a fierce storm that sank the ships with war machines aboard, an event the Romans attributed to divine intervention. The land force led by Muawiyah in Chalcedon, having lost their artillery and siege engines, returned to Syria thereafter.

Muslim sources do not mention this event but it corresponds to notices in other Christian histories of the eastern Mediterranean, such as the chronicle of Theophanes. It suggests the early 650s invasions of Rhodes, Cyprus, and Asia Minor were preparatory to a full-scale assault on the walls of Constantinople. Also it provides a strategic explanation for the Arab fleet's retreat following the victory in the Battle of the Masts, since the First Fitna would not break out until a year later, perhaps influenced by setbacks against the Byzantines and in the Caucasus.

Aftermath

Both the Rashidun and Roman fleets endured major casualties. Nonetheless, the Muslim victory was a significant event in the naval history of the Mediterranean Sea. From long being considered a 'Roman lake', the Mediterranean became a focus of contention between the naval might of the rising Caliphate and the Eastern Roman Empire.

This conflict would continue over the subsequent decades, with Muslims using their supremacy in the Mediterranean to go as far as Sicily and establish strongholds in Western Europe. The victory also paved the way for uncontested Muslim expansion along the coastline of North Africa.

See also 
 Early Caliphate navy

References

Masts
655
Masts
650s in the Byzantine Empire
650s in the Rashidun Caliphate
Military history of the Mediterranean
Masts
Masts